"Safe Inside" is a song by British singer and songwriter James Arthur. The song was released as a digital download on 10 February 2017 in the United Kingdom by Columbia Records as the second single from his second studio album Back from the Edge (2016).

Commercial performance
On 3 February 2017, it rose from number 103 to 31 on the UK charts due to streaming and airplay, giving Arthur his fifth top 40 entry on the UK Singles Chart.

Music video
A music video to accompany the release of "Safe Inside" was first released onto YouTube on Christmas Day 2016 at a total length of three minutes and forty three seconds.

Track listing

Charts

Certifications

Release history

References

2017 singles
2016 songs
James Arthur songs
Song recordings produced by Jonathan Quarmby
Songs written by James Arthur
Songs written by Emma Rohan